The Ven. William Whitworth was an Anglican priest: the Archdeacon of Sarum from 22 May 1766 until his death on 14 May 1804.

Whitworth was educated at Katharine Hall. He was the Incumbent at Stilton. He left £45,000 in his will to his great nephew.

References

1804 deaths
Alumni of St Catharine's College, Cambridge
Archdeacons of Sarum
18th-century English Anglican priests
19th-century English Anglican priests
People from Stilton